Potomac Riverkeeper Network is an environmental, registered non-profit organization based in Washington, D.C. that is dedicated to protecting the Potomac River and its tributaries. As a "riverkeeper" organization, it is a member of the umbrella organization Waterkeeper Alliance.

History
Potomac Riverkeeper Network, a member of the Waterkeeper Alliance, based in Washington, DC was established in 2000 by principals from other environmental organizations, including: the Potomac Conservancy, Piedmont Environmental Council, Audubon Naturalist Society, and Sierra Club. The goal was to create a strong advocate for the Potomac Watershed--which includes the Potomac River, Shenandoah River, and Upper Potomac River--and enforce existing federal and state laws governing the Potomac watershed and protecting it from exploitation. The President Emeritus, Ed Merrifield, was hired in 2003 and Jeff Kelble was hired as the Shenandoah Riverkeeper in 2006. In 2014, Brent Walls became the Upper Potomac Riverkeeper, adding a third formal Riverkeeper program to Potomac Riverkeeper, Inc.. in 2014, Jeff Kelble became President of the organization, leaving behind his former role as the Shenandoah Riverkeeper. In 2015, Mark Frondorf joined the organization as the new Shenandoah Riverkeeper, as well as Dean Naujoks as the new Potomac Riverkeeper. The three Riverkeeper branches call home to Potomac Riverkeeper Network, although operating within their specific regions.

Potomac Riverkeeper is a member of the Waterkeeper Alliance, one of the fastest growing environmental organizations in the world. The Waterkeeper movement began on New York's Hudson River in 1966 when commercial and recreational fishermen united to save the river. The early successes of Hudson Riverkeeper spurred an explosive growth of similar grassroots programs across the globe.

Mission statement
Potomac Riverkeeper's mission is to stop pollution and to restore clean water in the Potomac and Shenandoah Rivers and tributaries through enforcement and community engagement.

Current work
In addition to its dedication to monitoring and enforcement of point source and non-point source pollution, Potomac Riverkeeper currently focuses on four main issues:
Major Polluters
Agricultural Pollution
Resource Extraction
Storm Water
Sewage
Water Quality Standards

Shenandoah Riverkeeper and Upper Potomac Riverkeeper
In 2006, Potomac Riverkeeper, Inc. added a second Riverkeeper program for the Shenandoah River. The Shenandoah River is the largest river that flows into the Potomac River. Shenandoah Riverkeeper uses community action and enforcement to protect and restore water quality in the Shenandoah Valley for people, fish, and aquatic life.

Jeff Kelble, the Shenandoah Riverkeeper, patrols the water, educates the community, and advocates for a healthier Shenandoah River. Jeff knows how an unhealthy river can hurt the local economy and the health of the local residents. In 2005, after fish kills ruined his fishing guide business, Jeff closed his 6-year old business and joined up with Potomac Riverkeeper.

Shenandoah Riverkeeper's job is to investigate pollution in the Shenandoah and start a dialogue with the polluters. If the polluters do not listen, or do not stop polluting, Shenandoah Riverkeeper is ready to use the citizen suit provisions of the Clean Water Act, the Resource Conservation and Recovery Act, and other environmental laws.

In 2014, Potomac Riverkeeper, Inc. added a third Riverkeeper program for the Upper Potomac. Potomac Riverkeeper, Inc. is now made up of three active Riverkeeper programs: Potomac Riverkeeper, Upper Potomac Riverkeeper, and Shenandoah Riverkeeper. Together, the three Riverkeepers watch over almost the entire Potomac watershed, stretching through Maryland, DC, Virginia, West Virginia and southern Pennsylvania.

In 2019, water analysis by the Upper Potomac Riverkeeper group found toxic substances consistent with black liquor from the kraft papermaking process, including arsenic, boron and methyl mercury, originating from the Luke Mill in Luke, Maryland.

References

Potomac River
Environmental organizations based in Washington, D.C.
Water organizations in the United States
Non-profit organizations based in Washington, D.C.
Environmental organizations established in 2000
2000 establishments in the United States